Perichlaena is a genus of flowering plants belonging to the family Bignoniaceae.

Its native range is Madagascar.

Species:
 Perichlaena richardii Baill.

References

Bignoniaceae
Bignoniaceae genera